Pandemonium is a 1987 Australian fantasy comedy horror film in the style of The Rocky Horror Picture Show.

Plot synopsis
Raised by a family of dingoes, a young feral girl heads for Babylon, Australia to find her family, only to find that her mother is not all she seems.

Cast
Amanda Dole as the dingo girl
David Argue as Kales Leadingham / Ding the Dingo
Esben Storm as E.B. De Woolf / Husband
Arna-Maria Winchester as P.B. De Woolf / Wife
Lex Marinos as Dick Dickerson / Detective
Ian Nimmo as Mr. David
Mercia Deane-Johns as Morticia
Haydn Keenan as Dr. Doctor

Reception
Australian film critic Michael Adams later included Pandemonium on his list of the worst ever Australian films, along with Phantom Gold, The Glenrowan Affair, Houseboat Horror, Welcome to Woop Woop, Les Patterson Saves the World and The Pirate Movie.

References

External links
Pandemonium at Street Smart Films
Pandemonium at IMDb

Australian comedy horror films
1980s English-language films
1980s Australian films